Accattone (lit. "vagabond", "scrounger") is a 1961 Italian drama film written and directed by Pier Paolo Pasolini. It was Pasolini's first film as a director and premiered at the Venice Film Festival.

Plot
Vittorio, nicknamed "Accattone", leads a mostly serene life as a pimp in the outskirts of Rome until his prostitute, Maddalena, is hurt by a rivaling gang and sent to prison for false testimony. Finding himself without either a steady income or much inclination for working himself, he first tries to reconcile with the estranged mother of his child, but is driven away by her relatives. He meets simple working girl Stella and tries to lure her into prostituting herself for him. She is willing to try, but when her first client begins pawing her she cries and is thrown out of his car. Accattone tries to support them both as an iron worker, but gives up after one day. Following a dream of his own death, he goes stealing with a couple of friends and gets killed in a traffic accident when he tries to evade the police on a stolen motorcycle.

Cast
 Franco Citti as Vittorio "Accattone" Cataldi
 Franca Pasut as Stella
 Silvana Corsini as Maddalena
 Paola Guidi as Ascenza
 Adriana Asti as Amore
 Luciano Conti as Il Moicano
 Luciano Gonini as Piede D'Oro
 Renato Capogna as Renato
 Alfredo Leggi as Papo Hirmedo
 Galeazzo Riccardi as Cipolla
 Leonardo Muraglia as Mammoletto
 Giuseppe Ristagno as Peppe
 Roberto Giovannoni as The German
 Mario Cipriani as Balilla
 Roberto Scaringella as Cartagine
 Silvio Citti as Sabino
 Monica Vitti (uncredited) as Ascenza (voice)

Reception and legacy
Critic Gino Moliterno, writing for Senses of Cinema magazine, saw Accatone and its successor Mamma Roma as cinematic renditions of the world of the "borgate" (Roman shanty towns) of Pasolini's novels Ragazzi di vita (The Ragazzi or The Street Kids, 1955) and Una vita violenta (A Violent Life, 1959). Nick Barbaro of The Austin Chronicle titled it the possibly grimmest film he had ever seen.

Awards
Franco Citti was nominated for the BAFTA Award for Best Foreign Actor in 1963 for his performance.

References

External links
 
 
 

1961 films
Films directed by Pier Paolo Pasolini
1961 drama films
Italian black-and-white films
1960s Italian-language films
Films set in Rome
1961 directorial debut films
Italian drama films
1960s Italian films